Dalny is a rural locality (a settlement) in Valuysky District, Belgorod Oblast, Russia. The population was 434 as of 2010. There are 11 streets.

Geography 
Dalny is located 34 km south of Valuyki (the district's administrative centre) by road.

References 

Rural localities in Valuysky District

Renamed localities of Belgorod Oblast